The 1978 Temple Owls football team was an American football team that represented Temple University as an independent during the 1978 NCAA Division I-A football season. In its ninth season under head coach Wayne Hardin, the team compiled a 7–3–1 record and outscored opponents by a total of 280 to 203. The team played its home games at Veterans Stadium in Philadelphia. 

The team's statistical leaders included Brian Broomell with 1,362 passing yards, Zachary Dixon with 1,153 rushing yards and 60 points scored, and Steve Watson with 637 receiving yards.

Schedule

Roster

References

Temple
Temple Owls football seasons
Temple Owls football